is a Japanese television personality and actress.

Family  
She is the daughter of Christopher J. LaFleur, the former United States Ambassador to Malaysia, and Keiko Miyazawa LaFleur, the daughter of Kiichi Miyazawa, who served as Prime Minister of Japan from 1991 to 1993.  Her older sister is Sarah Miyazawa LaFleur.

Filmography

TV programmes

Internet

Mobile

Radio

Musicals

Advertisements

Film

Television drama

See also
May J., Miyazawa's classmate at Morimura Gakuen

References

External links
 
 
Emma Miyazawa: Kiichi Miyazawa Moto Shushō no Magomusume de Wadai ni! Geinō-kai Debut kara Shōrai no Yume, Shira rezaru Seijika Ikka no Hiwa made Kataru! - Oricon Style 

Japanese television personalities
Japanese musical theatre actresses
Japanese people of American descent
Singers from Tokyo
1988 births
Living people
Emma